HMS Chameleon (J387) was a turbine engine-powered  during the Second World War.

Design and description

The ships' complement consisted of 85 officers and ratings.

The reciprocating ships had two vertical triple-expansion steam engines, each driving one shaft, using steam provided by two Admiralty three-drum boilers.

The Algerine class was armed with a QF  Mk V anti-aircraft gun and four twin-gun mounts for Oerlikon 20 mm cannon. The latter guns were in short supply when the first ships were being completed and they often got a proportion of single mounts. By 1944, single-barrel Bofors 40 mm mounts began replacing the twin 20 mm mounts on a one for one basis. All of the ships were fitted for four throwers and two rails for depth charges.

Construction and career
The ship was ordered on 20 August 1941 at the Harland & Wolff at Belfast, Ireland. She was laid down on 20 August 1943 and launched on 6 May 1944. The ship was commissioned on 14 September 1944.

In April 1945,  the ship and the 37th Minesweeping Flotilla were deployed in support of the Operation Dracula. The ship rejoined the 7th Flotilla at Singapore and remained in the Far East until February 1946.

She returned to the UK with the six ships of the Flotilla to be decommissioned. The ship was later recommissioned in 1947 and put into the 2nd Minesweeping Flotilla, Mediterranean Fleet based in Malta.

Between 1947 and 1954, she was deployed for Palestine patrol with other Fleet units and took part in the standard Exercise and Visits Programmes each year after 1948.

In 1954, she returned to UK with HMS Plucky, Recruit and Rifleman of the 2nd Flotilla. After arrival at Portsmouth on 13 December that year, the ship was decommissioned again and put into the reserve fleet. She was placed on the disposal list in 1965. The ship was refitted during this period when a Squid anti-submarine mortar was fitted.

In 1966, she was sold to BISCO for scrap by the Ardmore Steel at Silloth, Cumberland in which she arrived on 3 April of the same year.

References

Bibliography
 
 
 Peter Elliott (1977) Allied Escort Ships of World War II. MacDonald & Janes,

External links
 

 

Algerine-class minesweepers of the Royal Navy
Ships built in Belfast
1944 ships
World War II minesweepers of the United Kingdom